Salsorro is the name of a salsa congress in northwest Spain, and the name of a European salsa website.

Since 2002, Salsorro takes place every November in Galicia (Spain). The Salsorro Festival is considered one of the most important in Europe, among others such as the Switzerland Salsa Congress in Zurich, the Hamburg Salsa Congress, Murcia Baila or the Simposium de Salsa de Madrid.

Salsorro is also the name of a Spanish salsa website created in August 2001 by Diego Berea and Alfonso Noya to promote the salsa scene in Spain and Portugal.

According to the salsa ranking, Salsorro is the most visited salsa website in Spain and also the most visited European salsa website in Spanish.

Among its sections, it contains news about salsa congresses, salsa festivals and competitions, forums and galleries, blogs, videos, a salsa shop and a directory of Salsa schools, instructors, dancers and clubs. Its original scope was Galicia but nowadays it also includes relevant information from Spain, Portugal and several other European countries.

References

External links
 
 Salsorro videos at YouTube

Salsa